Marinomonas gallaica is a Gram-negative bacterium from the genus of Marinomonas which has been isolated from the clam species Ruditapes decussatus.

References

External links
Type strain of Marinomonas gallaica at BacDive -  the Bacterial Diversity Metadatabase

Oceanospirillales
Bacteria described in 2016